The 1947 Florida A&M Rattlers football team was an American football team that represented Florida A&M College as a member of the Southern Intercollegiate Athletic Conference (SIAC) during the 1947 college football season. In their third season under head coach Jake Gaither, the Rattlers compiled a 9–1 record, including a victory over Hampton in the Orange Blossom Classic. The Rattlers played their home games at Sampson-Bragg Field in Tallahassee, Florida.

Florida A&M ranked No. 3 among the nation's black college football teams according to the Pittsburgh Courier and its Dickinson Rating System.

Key players included quarterbacks Jim Williams and Leroy Cromartie, fullback Bernie Ingraham, halfback Elman Williams, running back Ulysses Curtis, end Nathaniel Powell, William Rolle, tackle John Burgess, and center Wilbur Gary.

Prior to the team's October 18 game against , the university dedicated Bragg Stadium in honor of Jubie Bragg and his son Eugene Bragg.

Schedule

References

Florida AandM
Florida A&M Rattlers football seasons
Florida AandM Rattlers football